Suckow is a German surname. Notable people with the surname include:

Friedrich Wilhelm Ludwig Suckow (1770–1838), German naturalist, son of George Adolph Suckow
Georg Adolf Suckow (1751–1813), German physicist, chemist, mineralogist, mining engineer and naturalist, father of Friedrich Wilhelm Ludwig Suckow
Ruth Suckow (1892–1960), American author
Wendel Suckow (born 1967), American luger

German-language surnames